Sinai Synagogue is a Reform Jewish congregation on Roman Avenue in Roundhay, Leeds, West Yorkshire, England. It was founded in 1944 and is affiliated to the Movement for Reform Judaism. 

The community has a burial ground in current use at Harehills Cemetery, Leeds, which is managed by Leeds City Council.

It publishes a quarterly magazine, the Sinai Chronicle.

History
Prior to World War II the Jewish community in Leeds was overwhelmingly Orthodox.  Rabbi L. Graf of the Reform Synagogue in Bradford attempted to start a community of worship in Leeds, presiding over a service of six people in a house in Oakwood on 8 January 1944.  Numbers grew and services moved to a variety of sites, eventually buying the defunct Sephardi Synagogue building at 21 Leopold Street, Leeds 7 in November 1951, which was used until 16 September 1960.

Plans for a new building on Roman Avenue began in 1957.  Construction began in March 1960, and was completed in November of the same year.  It was designed by Halpern & Associates of London. On 12 June 1960 the foundation stone was laid and a section of Harehills Cemetery consecrated for the use of the congregation.  The building was consecrated on 6 November 1960.

In 1969 it was recognised as a "major organisation in the community" by the Leeds Jewish Representative Council, gaining a seat on the Executive.

Cultural activities such as religious classes expanded until they were too large for the rooms, so a temporary building was erected in the car park in 1965; this was used until 1985, by which time additional rooms had been attached to the synagogue.

See also
 List of former synagogues in the United Kingdom
 List of Jewish communities in the United Kingdom
 List of places of worship in the City of Leeds
 Movement for Reform Judaism

References

External links 
 

1944 establishments in England
1960 establishments in England
Reform synagogues in the United Kingdom
Religious buildings and structures in Leeds
Roundhay
Synagogues completed in 1960